Charlie Tough (5 April 1880 – 28 June 1927) was a former Australian rules footballer who played with Carlton in the Victorian Football League (VFL).

Notes

External links 

		
Charlie Tough's profile at Blueseum

1880 births
Australian rules footballers from Melbourne
Brunswick Football Club players
Carlton Football Club players
1927 deaths
People from Brunswick, Victoria